The Roe state by-election, 1967 was a by-election held on 2 September 1967 for the Western Australian Legislative Assembly seat of Roe in the southeastern agricultural part of the state.

The by-election was triggered by the resignation of Country Party member Tom Hart on 6 July 1967.

The seat of Roe, first established in 1950, was considered to be a safe seat for the Country Party. At the time of the by-election, the seat included the towns of Dumbleyung, Gnowangerup, Kondinin, Kulin, Lake Grace, Narembeen and Ravensthorpe.

Timeline

Candidates 
The by-election attracted two candidates. Bill Young, representing the Country Party, was a farmer and party official residing in Kondinin, while Mel Bungey, representing the Liberal and Country League, was a farmer residing in Gnowangerup.

Results
Bill Young easily retained the seat for the Country Party. No swings are noted due to the seat being uncontested at the 1965 election.

References 

Roe state by-election 1967
Western Australian state by-elections
1960s in Western Australia
Roe state by-election 1967